The BET Hip Hop Awards are an annual awards show, airing on BET, showcasing hip hop performers, producers and music video directors. The awards ceremony began in 2006; it was held on November 12, 2006 at the Fox Theatre in Atlanta, Georgia, and was first aired November 15, hosted by comedian Katt Williams.

The second ceremony was held on October 13, 2007 and aired on October 17 of the same year. Like its predecessor, the ceremony was also held at the Fox Theater in Atlanta, and was hosted by Katt Williams. The third ceremony premiered on October 23, 2008. This ceremony was hosted by popular R&B and hip hop artist T-Pain. The fourth ceremony was held on October 10, 2009 and was hosted by Mike Epps and aired on October 27. The fifth ceremony was held on October 2, 2010 (aired October 12) and was also by hosted Mike Epps. Epps hosted two additional years (2011 & 2012), and Snoop Dogg hosted in 2013, 2014, and 2015.

Ceremony

Most Wins 
 Kendrick Lamar — 25 wins
 Jay Z — 24 wins
 Drake — 22 wins
 Kanye West & Lil Wayne — 16 wins
 Cardi B — 14 wins

Category

Current Award
 DJ of the Year – (award given 2007~present)
 Hustler of the Year – (award given 2006~present)
 Lyricist of the Year – (award given 2006~present)
 MVP of the Year – (award given 2006~present)
 Producer of the Year – (award given 2006~present)
 Best Live Performer – (award given 2006~present and formerly known as Hot Ticket Performer)
 Video Director of the Year – (award given 2006~present)
 Best New Hip Hop Artist – (award given 2006~present and formerly known as Rookie of the Year or Who Blew Up Award)
 Made-You-Look Award (Best Hip Hop Style) – (award given 2009~present)
 Album of the Year – (award given 2006~present and formerly known as CD of the Year)
 Single of the Year – (award given 2006~present and formerly known as Track of the Year)
 Best Collaboration, Duo or Group – (award given 2006~present and formerly known as Perfect Combo Award)
 Best Hip Hop Video – (award given 2006~present)
 Best Mixtape – (award given 2011~present)
 Sweet 16: Best Featured Verse – (award given 2011~present)
 Impact Track – (award given 2012~present)

Defunct Award
 Best Club Banger of the year – (award given 2010~2015)
 Best Online Site – (award given 2009~2014)
 People's Champ Award – (award given 2006~2016)
 Best Ringtone – (award given 2006~2008)
 Best UK Hip Hop Act – (award given 2006~2008)
 Best Movie – (award given 2006~2007)
 Best Dance – (award given 2006~2007)

References

External links
 Official BET website

BET Hip Hop Awards
Awards
Hip hop awards
American music awards
American television awards
Awards established in 2006
African-American events
Awards honoring African Americans